Nishant Singh Malkani (born 1 September 1987) is an Indian actor.

Early life
Malkani was born on 1 September 1987 in Dubai. He completed his schooling from Laxman Public School and MBA from IIM Kolkata. He got his first role in Miley Jab Hum Tum as adhiraj while he was doing MBA in kolkata.

Career 
Malkani's first television role was in Star One's romantic drama Miley Jab Hum Tum as Adhiraj Singh which he began in 2009. It wrapped up in 2010. He portrayed Anukalp Gandhi in Ram Milaayi Jodi on Zee TV in 2010 but quit in 2011 to search for film work.

Later, he debuted in Vikram Bhatt movie Horror Story in 2013 and he was also seen in movies like Bezubaan Ishq, cute kameena, love training. 

In 2017 Malkani debuted in web ; he played Raj in the web series Ragini MMS: Returns. 

He made a comeback to television on September 2018 portraying the lead Akshat Jindal in Zee TV's Guddan Tumse Na Ho Payega, until he quit the series in 2020. It is regarded as his best and most lovable performance ever in his career.

In 2020, Malkani participated in the reality show Bigg Boss 14 as a contestant. He survived for 5 weeks before getting evicted.

In the media

Nishant Malkani was ranked 10th in the Times Of India's 20 Most Desirable Men on Television 2020.

He was ranked at 44th position in Times of India's 50 Most Desirable Men of 2020.

Filmography

Films

Television

Special appearances

Web series

References

External links

 
 
 

1988 births
Living people
People from Dubai
Indian expatriates in the United Arab Emirates
Male actors in Hindi television
Sindhi people
Bigg Boss (Hindi TV series) contestants